Shooting, for the 2017 Island Games, held at four locations in Gotland, Sweden in June 2017:
 Snögrinde, Klinte 
 Svajde shooting range, Visby
 Skyttehall indoor range, Visby
 Hejdeby shooting range Visby

General 
The last two shooting events at the Island Games have been dominated by Jersey and Gotland, although at the last games in Jersey, 13 countries managed to get at least one gold medal.

All visiting competitors have to comply with Swedish customs for the temporary import of weapons and ammunition for the event.

Medal table

Results

Men

Women

Open

Other

References

Island
2017
Shooting